Pipat Singsanee (born 13 December 1939) is a Thai judoka. He competed in the men's middleweight event at the 1964 Summer Olympics.

References

1939 births
Living people
Pipat Singsanee
Pipat Singsanee
Judoka at the 1964 Summer Olympics
Place of birth missing (living people)
Pipat Singsanee